Weightlifting was one of the sports contested at the 2022 Commonwealth Games,  held in Birmingham, England. This was the nineteenth staging of weightlifting at the Commonwealth Games since its inclusion in 1950, and the second staging within England specifically.

The competition took place between 30 July and 3 August 2022, spread across sixteen weight classes (eight per gender).

Schedule
The competition schedule is as follows:

Venue
The weightlifting competitions will be held at the National Exhibition Centre in Solihull. Five other sports - badminton, boxing, netball, para powerlifting and table tennis - will also take place there.

Qualification

A total of 180 weightlifters (90 per gender) qualify to compete at the Games. Nations may earn one quota per weight class, allocated as follows:
 The host nation.
 The 2021 Commonwealth champion.
 Athletes on the IWF Commonwealth Ranking List as of 28 February 2022.
 Recipient of a CGF/IWF Bipartite Invitation.

Medal summary

Medal table

Medalists

Men's events

Women's events

Participating nations
There were 37 participating Commonwealth Games Associations (CGA's) in weightlifting with a total of 174 (90 men and 84 women) athletes. The number of athletes a nation entered is in parentheses beside the name of the country.

References

External links
 Results Book – Weightlifting

 
2022 Commonwealth Games events
Commonwealth Games
2022
Weightlifting in the United Kingdom